A fuel cell auxiliary power unit (FC-APU) is a fuel cell based auxiliary power unit on a vehicle that provides energy for functions other than propulsion. They are mainly used in trucking, aviation, marine and recreational vehicles.

Market
In 2010 there were globally 3,100 fuel cell APU  shipments.

Trucks
Around 300,000 refrigerator trucks with auxiliary power units are on the road in the United States. In recent years, truck and fuel cell manufacturers have teamed up to create, test and demonstrate a fuel cell APU that eliminates nearly all emissions  and uses diesel fuel more efficiently.  In 2008, a DOE sponsored partnership between Delphi Electronics and Peterbilt demonstrated that a fuel cell could provide power to the electronics and air conditioning of a Peterbilt Model 386 under simulated "idling" conditions for 10 hours. Delphi has said the 5 kW system for Class 8 trucks will be released in 2012, at an $8000–9000 price tag that would be competitive with other "midrange" two-cylinder diesel APUs, should they be able to meet those deadlines and cost estimates.

Research
RDSO started a project to develop fuel cell assisted Auxiliary power units in diesel-electric locomotives of Indian Railways.
PowerCell is testing an autothermal reformer and a PEM fuel cell stack to convert diesel fuel into electricity for trucks.

See also
 Refrigerator car
 Refrigerated container
 Trailer refrigeration unit

References

Starting systems
Electrical generators
Aircraft auxiliary power units
Fuel cells